Trześniówka is a river in Poland, a right tributary of the Vistula (near the city of Sandomierz). Its length is 56.9 km with a basin area of 569.6 km². During the Central European floods in June 2010 Trześniówka flooded parts of Sandomierz.

Tributaries 
 Kaczówka
 Koniecpólka
 Mokrzyszówka
 Żupawka
 Dąbrówka

See also 
 Rivers of Poland

Rivers of Poland
Rivers of Podkarpackie Voivodeship
Rivers of Świętokrzyskie Voivodeship